Bosley is a locale in Cheshire, England.

Bosley may also refer to:

People and characters
 Bosley (surname)

Given named
 Bosley Crowther (1905–1981), U.S. journalist
 Bosley Yu (born 2009), HK soccer player
 James Bosley Noel Wyatt (1847–1926), U.S. architect
 Minta Bosley Allen Trotman (1875-1949), African-American suffragist

Nicknamed
 Boz Scaggs (born 1944, nicknamed "Bosley"), U.S. musician
 Bosley (Charlie's Angels), a fictional employment title in the Charlie's Angels (franchise)

Places
 Bosley (village), Cheshire, England, UK
 Bosley (civil parish), Cheshire, England, UK
 Bosley railway station, Bosley, Cheshire, England, UK
 Bosley Reservoir, Peak District, England, UK
 Bosley Lock Flight, Peak District, England, UK
 Bosley Cloud (Bosley Hill), Peak District, England, UK
 Bosley Minn (Bosley Hill), Peak District, England, UK
 Fort Bosley, Susquehanna Valley, Pennsylvania, USA
 Bosley Butte, Klamath Mountains, Oregon, USA; a mountain
 Bosley Run, Brooke County, West Virginia, USA; a creek
, Illinois, USA

Other uses
Bosley (automobile)
Bosley Medical Institute; a U.S. company involved in the trademark infringement case Bosley Medical Institute, Inc. v. Kremer

See also

 
 John Bosley (disambiguation)